Juan Carlos Leaño Del Castillo (born 22 November 1977) is a Mexican former professional football defender who played his whole career with Tecos. Leaño made his professional debut with Estudiantes in 1998. He is also the son of José Antonio Leaño, chairman of the club.

On 27 April 2012, after his team lost the permanence in the Mexican Primera División Leaño announced his retirement from football.

See also
List of one-club men

References

External links
 

1977 births
Living people
Mexican footballers
Association football defenders
Liga MX players
Tecos F.C. footballers
Footballers from Guadalajara, Jalisco